Cock Bridge can refer to:

Cock Bridge (Aberdeenshire)
Cock Bridge (Ljubljana)

See also

Tickle Cock Bridge